Rai 4 (pronounced Rai Quattro) is an Italian free-to-air television channel owned and operated by state-owned public broadcaster RAI – Radiotelevisione italiana. Launched on 14 July 2008 with the film Elephant, Rai 4 targets youths with films, TV series and anime.

History 
Rai 4 was launched, after a countdown, on 14 July 2008 at 21:00 CEST with the broadcast of the film Elephant. In the starting phase, it mainly had cult TV series, films, in addition to the "home runs" of L'Isola dei Famosi and X Factor (both programs on Rai 2).

The management was entrusted to Carlo Freccero from the launch date until 4 August 2013, followed by the interim of Luigi Gubitosi until mid-October.

The management was originally the responsibility of RaiSat, which also took care of packaging channels exclusively for Sky Italia. RaiSat was supposed to manage the channel for three years, but due to the decision to close the company on 27 April 2010, the management of Rai 4 passed directly to Rai.

Since 2012, Rai 4 has offered some short news bulletins made by the editorial staff of Rai News24.

Since June 2012, a second audio channel has been active on which the original audio of many of the films and series broadcast by the channel is available.

From 17 October 2013, the Rai board of directors decided to merge the channel under the management of Rai Gold.

Since 2014 it has broadcast both semifinals of the Eurovision Song Contest.

From 13 September 2015 Rai 4 becomes visible on the Sky Italia platform at position 104.

On 7 December 2015 Rai 4 launches a new afternoon slot dedicated to anime, in addition to the Thursday night space. After the experimentation with the anime company Dynit. WIth Sword Art Online and Steins;Gate already broadcast at night, this band is dedicated to the transmission of Fairy Tail, the first anime to be purchased and voiced directly by the channel.

As announced by Rai itself during the IV meeting with Tivùsat, Rai 4 started broadcasting in high definition from 22 January 2016 on channels 110 and on Sky Italia channel 104.

From 18 February 2016 the channel, together with the others belonging to the Rai Gold structure, has been entrusted to Angelo Teodoli, former director of Rai 2.

The same year the sport debuts: it broadcasts the opening concert of Euro 2016 commented by Filippo Solibello and Marco Ardemagni (former ESC commentators) and the 27 games of which Rai has the rights with the commentary of Gialappa's band under the title Rai dire Europeans. Given the success of this experiment, the trio will comment on Italy's friendlies and qualifying matches for the 2018 FIFA World Cup under the title Rai dire Nazionale.

From 12 September 2016 Rai 4 changes the logo together with Rai 1, Rai 2, and Rai 3, and color, passing from magenta to purple.

From 19 September 2016, the high-definition version also lands on digital terrestrial, on the Mux 5.

The official speaker of the network is Massimo Lodolo.

From 8 to 14 July 2018, on the occasion of the channel's 10th anniversary, a special promo graphic will be introduced, a contest in which birthday wishes can be made, and a new slogan: Ten years into the future. Furthermore, the hashtag # Rai4diecianni appears under the logo.

On 13 September 2018, following the non-renewal of the contract, the channel leaves the Sky Italia platform.

Logos and identities

Programming
A few programmes include:
 Battlestar Galactica
 Being Erica
 Beverly Hills, 90210
 Blossom
 Breaking Bad
 Charmed
 Doctor Who
 Dream On
 Eurovision Song Contest (Semi-Finals)
 Heroes
 Misfits
 NUMB3RS
 Once Upon a Time
 Primeval
 Private Practice
 Spider Riders
 Switched at Birth
 Two and a Half Men
 The Fresh Prince Of Bel-Air
 Underbelly

Anime
From 24 September 2009 Rai 4 has added several Japanese anime to its programming, mostly on Rai 1. The main appointment was immediately the space of Thursday night, which usually proposed two episodes of different series. There were also transmission spaces in the morning at the weekend, in which other works found space: in the first months they were located both on Saturday and Sunday morning, but already from January 2010 they began to use only on Sundays. The morning slot was last used in the 2013/2014 season. Finally, in the summer, replicas of products already broadcast were mainly proposed.

Starting from 7 December 2015, in addition to the Thursday evening slot, an afternoon slot was introduced designed for the transmission of Fairy Tail, the first anime purchased and dubbed directly by the channel. For the first weeks, the network offered reruns of two souls broadcast on Thursday night (Sword Art Online and Steins;Gate), with the aim of making the band known to the public, and then continue, from 11 January 2016, with the broadcasting of Fairy Tail, with the double episode: to be precise, the first is the replica of the second episode of the previous day, while the second is the new episode. There are also almost always reruns of the latest episodes broadcast early in the morning and at night. However, from June 2016 Fairy Tail was moved to nighttime, and on 4 August 2016, the series was definitively suspended after the broadcast of episode 149. This maneuver, combined with the failure to confirm the time slot on Thursday evening, marked up to today the end of the programming of anime on the channel.

Below is the list of anime series broadcast by Rai 4 from 2009 to 2016: all of these were purchased, dubbed, and distributed by home video distribution companies, which granted a broadcast license to the channel.
 Anohana: The Flower We Saw That Day
 Aria
 Attack of Titan  Code Geass: Lelouch of the Rebellion Den-noh Coil Eureka Seven Ergo Proxy  Fairy Tail  (The only anime to have been purchased and dubbed directly by the channel).
 The Melancholy of Haruhi Suzumiya Love Com Puella Magi Madoka Magica Penguindrum Nana Noein: To Your Other Self Planetes Psycho-Pass Romeo × Juliet Gurren Lagann Soul Eater Special A Steins;Gate Sword Art Online Toradora! Tokyo Magnitude 8.0 Welcome to the N.H.K.''

References

External links
 Official website 
 

Italian-language television stations
Television channels and stations established in 2008
4
Movie channels
Classic television networks